The 1902 Wyoming Cowboys football team represented the University of Wyoming as an independent during the 1902 college football season. In its third season under head coach William McMurray, the team played only one game, defeating Cheyenne High School by an 18–0 score. There was no team captain.

Schedule

References

Wyoming
Wyoming Cowboys football seasons
Wyoming Cowboys football
College football undefeated seasons